Ira T. Fiss (November 7, 1888 – June 18, 1955) is a former Speaker of the Pennsylvania House of Representatives.

Fiss was elected to the Pennsylvania House of Representatives in 1937 and served through 1948 .

Fiss was from Shamokin Dam, Snyder County, Pennsylvania. 

Members of the Pennsylvania House of Representatives
Speakers of the Pennsylvania House of Representatives
1888 births
1955 deaths
20th-century American politicians